Daniel Jones (26 September 1908 – 19 February 1985) was a British Labour Party politician, and Member of Parliament (MP) for Burnley from 1959 to 1983.

Early life
Jones was educated at Ynyshir School, Rhondda and the National Council of Labour Colleges where he himself became a lecturer. He was a trade union official.

Parliamentary career
He unsuccessfully contested the Barry constituency at the 1955 general election, but was returned as MP for Burnley at the 1959 general election. He was re-elected until his retirement at the 1983 general election, when he was succeeded by Peter Pike.  Jones's Conservative opponent in the 1979 election was Ann Widdecombe, who was making her first parliamentary contest.

Jones never attained ministerial office, but served as parliamentary private secretary to Douglas Jay the President of the Board of Trade in 1964.

Family
He was married to his wife, Phylis.
He had 3 children and fostered 3 more.
His two sons were called, Emlyn and Michael.
Emlyn went on to work for EMI.
Michael became a secondary school teacher.
His daughter Dari Taylor went on to become the Member of Parliament for Stockton South serving between 1997 and 2010.

References 
Times Guide to the House of Commons, 1979 and 1983 editions

External links 
 

1908 births
1985 deaths
Amalgamated Engineering Union-sponsored MPs
Labour Party (UK) MPs for English constituencies
UK MPs 1959–1964
UK MPs 1964–1966
UK MPs 1966–1970
UK MPs 1970–1974
UK MPs 1974
UK MPs 1974–1979
UK MPs 1979–1983
Welsh politicians
Politics of Burnley